Budapest Honvéd Football Club is a professional football club based in Budapest, Hungary.

List of managers

 Béla Stalmach (1935–37)
 Ferenc Puskás I (1937–42)
 Pál Titkos (1942–43)
 István Szokodi (1944)
 Ferenc Puskás I (1945–47)
 Béla Guttmann (1947–48)
 Ferenc Puskás I (1948–51)
 Jenő Kalmár (1952–56)
 Gábor Kiss (1957)
 Károly Sós (1957–60)
 György Babolcsay (1960–62)
 Gyula Lóránt (01/07/1962–30/06/1963)
 Nándor Bányai (1963)
 Mihály Kispéter (1963–66)
 József Bozsik (1966–67)
 György Babolcsay (1967)
 Kálmán Preiner (1968–71)
 György Babolcsay (1971)
 József Mészáros (1971–73)
 Lajos Faragó (1973–74)
 Károly Lakat (1974–76)
 Lajos Tichy (01/07/1976–30/06/1982)
 Imre Komora (01/07/1982–30/06/1986)
 István Vági (01/07/1986-31/12/1986)
 Imre Komora (1987)
 Bertalan Bicskei (1987–88)
 József Both (1989)
 Sándor Haász (1990)
 György Mezey (01/07/1990-30/06/1992)
 József Verebes (1992)
 Lajos Szurgent (1992)
 Martti Kuusela (1992–30/06/1994)
 Dimitri Davidović (01/07/1994–94)
 Mihály Kozma (1995)
 Péter Török (1995–96)
 Bertalan Bicskei (1996–97)
 Zoltán Varga (1997)
 Imre Komora (01/07/1997-30/06/1998)
 György Gálhidi (01/07/1998-30/06/1999)
 Imre Komora (1999)
 Soós Reszeli (1999–00)
 Barnabás Tornyi (2000–01)
 Lajos Szurgent (2001)
 Róbert Glázer (10/09/2001–15/12/2001)
 Lajos Détári (01/01/2002-30/06/2002)
 József Fitos (2002)
 Ioan Pătrașcu (27/08/2002-08/11/2002)
 Lajos Szurgent (08/11/2002-06/01/2003)
 Tibor Őze (2003)
 József Duró (13/04/2003-30/06/2003)
 György Gálhidi (01/07/2003-17/08/2004)
 György Bognár (18/08/2004-29/12/2004)
 Lajos Szurgent (06/01/2005-14/04/2005)
 Károly Gergely (14/04/2005-22/06/2005)
 Aldo Dolcetti (01/07/2005-19/10/2006)
 Attila Supka (01/07/2006-20/05/2008)
 Gábor Pölöskei (2008–09)
 Tibor Sisa (25/02/2009-23/10/2009) 
 Massimo Morales (28/10/2009–13/11/2010)
 László Szalai (interim) (17/11/2010–31/12/2010)
 Attila Supka (01/01/2011 – 30/05/2012)
 Marco Rossi (01/06/2012–28/04/2014)
 Pietro Vierchowod (3/06/2014 – 06/10/2014)
 József Csábi (26/10/2014-07/02/2015)
 Marco Rossi (07/02/2015–28.05.2017)
 Erik van der Meer (28.05.2017–10.12.2017)
 Attila Supka (10.12.2017-27.05.2019)
 Giuseppe Sannino (28.05.2019-19.03.2020)
 István Pisont (19.03.2020-1 July 2020)
 Tamás Bódog (1 July 2020-20 February 2021)
 Ferenc Horváth (21 February 2021-30 January 2022)
 Nebojša Vignjević (2 February 2022-present)
 Tam Courts (15 June 2022-24 October 2022)
 Dean Klafurić (24 October 2022-present)

References

External links

Budapest Honvéd FC